The 1917–18 Navy Midshipmen men's basketball team represented the United States Naval Academy in intercollegiate basketball during the 1917–18 season. The head coach was James Colliflower, coaching his second season with the Midshipmen.

Schedule

|-

References

Navy Midshipmen men's basketball seasons
Navy
Navy
Navy